Vermont v. Brillon, 556 U.S. 81 (2009), was a decision by the United States Supreme Court which ruled that when appointed counsel is responsible for delays in criminal proceedings, these delays are ordinarily attributable to the defendants they represent when conducting speedy trial analysis under Barker v. Wingo.

Background

In July 2001, Michael Brillon was arrested on felony domestic assault and habitual offender charges. Nearly three years later, in June 2004, he was tried by jury, found guilty as charged, and sentenced to 12 to 20 years in prison. During the time between his arrest and his trial, at least six different attorneys were appointed to represent him. Brillon "fired" his first attorney, who served from July 2001 to February 2002. His third lawyer, who served from March 2002 until June 2002, was allowed to withdraw when he reported that Brillon had threatened his life. His fourth lawyer served from June 2002 until November 2002, when the trial court released him from the case. His fifth lawyer, assigned two months later, withdrew in April 2003. Four months thereafter, his sixth lawyer was assigned, and she took the case to trial in June 2004.

The trial court denied Brillon's motion to dismiss for want of a speedy trial, a right guaranteed under the Sixth Amendment. The Vermont Supreme Court, however, reversed, holding that Brillon's conviction must be vacated, and the charges against him dismissed, because the State did not accord him a speedy trial. Citing the balancing test the Supreme Court stated in Barker v. Wingo, the Vermont Supreme Court concluded that all four factors described in Barker—"[l]ength of delay, the reason for the delay, the defendant’s assertion of his right, and prejudice to the defendant"—weighed against the State. Weighing heavily in Brillon's favor, the Vermont court said, the three-year delay in bringing him to trial was "extreme." In assessing the reasons for that delay, the court separately considered the period of each counsel's representation. It acknowledged that the first year, when Brillon was represented by his first and third lawyers, should not count against the State. But the court counted much of the remaining two years against the State. Delays in that period, the court determined, were caused, for the most part, by the failure or unwillingness of several of the assigned counsel, over an inordinate period of time, to move the case forward. As for the third and fourth Barker factors, the court found that Brillon repeatedly and adamantly demanded a trial and that his lengthy pretrial incarceration was prejudicial.

Decision

In a 7–2 decision, the Supreme Court, in an opinion by Ruth Bader Ginsburg, held that when appointed counsel is responsible for delays in criminal proceedings, these delays are ordinarily attributable to the defendants they represent when conducting speedy trial analysis under Barker v. Wingo. According to the Supreme Court, the Vermont court made a fundamental error in its application of Barker by attributing to the State delays caused by the failure of several assigned counsel to move Brillon's case forward and in failing adequately to take into account the role of Brillon's disruptive behavior in the overall balance.

An assigned counsel's failure to move the case forward does not warrant attribution of delay to the State. Most of the delay the Vermont court attributed to the State must therefore be attributed to Brillon as delays caused by his counsel, each of whom requested time extensions. Their inability or unwillingness to move the case forward may not be attributed to the State simply because they are assigned counsel. A contrary conclusion could encourage appointed counsel to delay proceedings by seeking unreasonable continuances, hoping thereby to obtain a dismissal of the indictment on speedy-trial grounds. Trial courts might well respond by viewing continuance requests made by appointed counsel with skepticism, concerned that even an apparently genuine need for more time is in reality a delay tactic. Yet the same considerations would not attend a privately retained counsel's requests for time extensions. There is no justification for treating defendants’ speedy-trial claims differently based on whether their counsel is privately retained or publicly assigned.

The Vermont Supreme Court further erred by treating the period of each counsel's representation discretely. The court failed appropriately to take into account Brillon's role during the first year of delay. Brillon sought to dismiss his first attorney on the eve of trial. His strident, aggressive behavior with regard to his third attorney further impeded prompt trial and likely made it more difficult for the Defender General's office to find replacement counsel. Absent Brillon's efforts to force the withdrawal of his first and third attorneys, no speedy-trial issue would have arisen.

The general rule attributing to the defendant delay caused by assigned counsel is not absolute. Delay resulting from a systemic breakdown in the public defender system could be charged to the State, but the Vermont Supreme Court made no such determination, and nothing in the record suggests that institutional problems caused any part of the delay in Brillon's case.

External links
 

2009 in United States case law
Speedy Trial Clause case law
United States Supreme Court cases of the Roberts Court
United States Supreme Court cases